Sir Arthur Alexander Foulkes  (born 11 May 1926) is a politician who was the ninth governor-general of the Bahamas from 2012 to 2014.

Foulkes was elected to the House of Assembly in 1967 and served in the government of Lynden Pindling as Minister of Communications and Minister of Tourism.  In 1971, he was a founder of the Free National Movement, and he was appointed to the Senate in 1972 and 1977 before returning to the House of Assembly in 1982.  He was appointed a Knight Commander of the Most Distinguished Order of Saint Michael and Saint George (KCMG) in 2001. He was promoted to Knight Grand Cross of the Most Distinguished Order of Saint Michael and Saint George (GCMG) in 2011.

Early life 
Foulkes, a native of the Bahamas, was born on the island of Inagua in Matthew Town on 11 May 1926. His parents were Dr. William and Mrs. Julie Foulkes (née Maisonneuve). Foulkes is married to the former Joan Eleanor Bullard of Nassau.

Career 

Foulkes started his working life as a newspaper linotype operator, first at the nation's daily newspaper of record since 1844, Nassau Guardian, then at the competing Tribune newspaper. He became a reporter for Tribune'''s editor Sir Étienne Dupuch, rising to become News Editor of Tribune. From 1962 to 1967, Foulkes was founding editor of Bahamian Times, the official paper of the Progressive Liberal Party, backing the campaign for majority rule, and later a columnist for Nassau Guardian and Tribune''.

In 1967, he was elected to Parliament and the following year appointed to serve in the Cabinet as Minister of Communications, then as Minister of Tourism. He was one of the founders of the Free National Movement in 1971.  He was appointed to the Senate in 1972 and 1977, and re-elected to the House of Assembly in 1982. In 1972, Foulkes was one of the four Opposition delegates to the Bahamas Independence Constitution Conference in London in 1972.

In 1992, Foulkes became the Bahamas' High Commissioner to the United Kingdom, serving also as ambassador to France, Germany, Italy, Belgium and the European Union, before becoming the first Bahamian ambassador to China and Cuba in 1999. Foulkes was sworn in as Governor-General of the Bahamas on 14 May 2012 and retired two years later on 7 July 2014.

References

External links 
 Bahama Islands Info: Sir Arthur Foulkes is new Governor-General

1926 births
Ambassadors of the Bahamas to Belgium
Ambassadors of the Bahamas to France
Ambassadors of the Bahamas to Germany
Ambassadors of the Bahamas to Italy
Ambassadors of the Bahamas to Cuba
Ambassadors of the Bahamas to China
Ambassadors of the Bahamas to the European Union
Free National Movement politicians
Governors-General of the Bahamas
High Commissioners of the Bahamas to the United Kingdom
Living people
Members of the House of Assembly of the Bahamas
Members of the Senate of the Bahamas
Progressive Liberal Party politicians
People from Inagua
21st-century Bahamian politicians